Pöörilaid (alternately: Pööriotsa laid) is an islet in the Baltic Sea belonging to the country of Estonia.

Pöörilaid covers approximately 0.0195 hectares, with a perimeter of 1.7 kilometers. The islet has a sinuous coastline and has, through natural process, become connected to the islet of Selglaid. The islet is fully protected since 1976 as part of the Sparrow Islets Landscape reserve (Estonian: Varbla laidude maastikukaitseala), and is an important breeding site for 54 species of birds. 

Pöörilaid belongs administratively to Lääneranna Parish in Pärnu County. A fully operational lighthouse has been in use on the island since its construction in 1939, and is maintained by the Estonian Maritime Administration.

See also
List of islands of Estonia

References

External links
Cinci World Atlas
Pöörilaid tuletorn

Estonian islands in the Baltic
Lääneranna Parish